Diacetyl peroxide is the organic peroxide with the formula (CH3CO2)2. It is a white solid or oily liquid with a sharp odor. As with a number of organic peroxides, it is explosive. It is often used as a solution, e.g., in dimethyl phthalate.

History
Diacetyl peroxide was discovered in 1858 by Benjamin Collins Brodie, who obtained the compound by treating glacial acetic acid with barium peroxide in anhydrous diethyl ether.

Preparation
Diacetyl peroxide forms upon combining hydrogen peroxide and excess acetic anhydride. Peracetic acid is an intermediate.

Safety 
Consisting of both an oxidizer, the O-O bond and reducing agents, the C-C and C-H bonds, diacetyl peroxide is shock sensitive and explosive.  

The threshold quantity for Process Safety Management per Occupational Safety and Health Administration 1910.119 is  if the concentration of the diacetyl peroxide solution is greater than 70%.

There have been reports of detonation of the pure material. The 25% solution also has explosive potential. The crystalline peroxide is especially shock sensitive and a high explosion risk.

Safety
Organic peroxides are all prone to exothermic decomposition, potentially leading to explosions and fire.

Contact with liquid causes irritation of eyes and skin. If ingested, it irritates mouth and stomach.

References 

Organic peroxides
Explosive chemicals
Liquid explosives
Organic peroxide explosives
Carbonyl compounds